The men's 400 metres event at the 1990 Commonwealth Games was held on 27 and 28 January at the Mount Smart Stadium in Auckland.

Medalists

Results

Heats
Qualification: First 6 of each heat (Q) and the next 6 fastest (q) qualified for the quarterfinals.

Quarterfinals
Qualification: First 4 of each heat (Q) and the next 2 fastest (q) qualified for the semifinals.

Semifinals
Qualification: First 4 of each heat (Q) and the next 1 fastest (q) qualified for the final.

Final

References

Semifinals results
Heats and Quarterfinals results

400
1990